Grigston is an unincorporated community in Scott County, Kansas, United States.

History
A post office was opened in Grigston (formerly Grigsby) in 1886, and remained in operation until it was discontinued in 1955.  Currently, the town consists only of several houses and a moderate-sized grain elevator complex.

References

Further reading

External links
 Scott County maps: Current, Historic, KDOT

Unincorporated communities in Scott County, Kansas
Unincorporated communities in Kansas